The following is a list of the 256 communes of the Deux-Sèvres department of France.

The communes cooperate in the following intercommunalities (as of 2020):
Communauté d'agglomération du Bocage Bressuirais
Communauté d'agglomération du Niortais
Communauté de communes Airvaudais-Val du Thouet
Communauté de communes Haut Val de Sèvre
Communauté de communes Mellois en Poitou
Communauté de communes de Parthenay-Gâtine
Communauté de communes du Thouarsais
Communauté de communes Val-de-Gâtine

References

Deux-Sevres